Siwakorn Jakkuprasat (born 23 April 1992), is a professional footballer from Thailand. He currently plays for Port in the Thai League 1. His goal during the Thai League Week 11 against PT Prachuap is considered one of the top 5 goals of the round in an article by FOX Sports Asia.

International career
In June 2019.he was in the squad of Thailand for 2019 King's Cup, but did not make an appearance.

Honours

International

Thailand U-23
 Sea Games  Gold Medal (1); 2015

Club

Port
 Thai FA Cup (1): 2019

References

External links
 
 

1992 births
Living people
Siwakorn Jakkuprasat
Siwakorn Jakkuprasat
Association football midfielders
Siwakorn Jakkuprasat
Siwakorn Jakkuprasat
Siwakorn Jakkuprasat
Siwakorn Jakkuprasat
Siwakorn Jakkuprasat
Southeast Asian Games medalists in football
Competitors at the 2015 Southeast Asian Games